Edgar Cruz is an independent classical and fingerstyle guitarist from Oklahoma City, Oklahoma. Having recorded over sixteen CDs in styles ranging from classical to flamenco to pop to jazz, Cruz is perhaps best known for his fingerstyle arrangement of Queen's "Bohemian Rhapsody". Additionally, Cruz was featured in an OETA (Oklahoma's PBS affiliate) documentary entitled "Spanish Blood - The Guitar of Edgar Cruz". Cruz took second place in the 1991 Walnut Valley Festival in Winfield, Kansas in the fingerstyle competition as did his brother Mark Anthony Cruz in 1993 & 2001. Cruz's career began when he followed in his father Manuel Cruz' footsteps playing for restaurant customers as a strolling guitarist. His marketing strategy was taken from his father who said, "play what your audience wants and they'll pay you well".

Each year Edgar Cruz performs over 200 concerts and has played throughout America, Europe and South America.  He has been a headliner at The Chet Atkins Festival in Nashville, TN since 1995 and is a strong icon at most festivals in Oklahoma including Festival of the Arts, Paseo Festival, Sunfest, Global Oklahoma and more. Cruz offers an incredible live repertoire of “The Greatest Hits of the Guitar”. Malagueña, Classical Gas, Bohemian Rhapsody, In the Mood, Dueling Banjos, Hotel California, A Classical Medley, Latin favorites and Medleys On the Fly are just a few examples.  Audience participation, clapping, singing, dancing, snapping, “oles and yee-haws” are all encouraged.  Sixteen CDs and 2 DVDs are currently available.  They cover moods from Latin, Classical, International, Rock, Jazz, Mariachi, Romantic, Christmas and originals.  Future works include a Live Video and more of the aforementioned.

Edgar has been named the Oklahoma's Top Performing Artist and/or Acoustic Guitarist for over ten years by the Oklahoma Gazette.  He has received numerous civic acknowledgments for his contributions to various charitable events. He also performs
for a wide variety of bookings including Concerts, Festivals, Weddings, Receptions, Banquets, Anniversaries, Birthdays, Schools, Churches, Conventions, Fiestas, Memorials, Masterclasses, Lessons, Restaurants or any special occasion.  Edgar holds a Bachelor of Music in Guitar Performance from Oklahoma City University, the first person to do so. Complete and up to date information can be found at  www.edgarcruz.com

External links
 Edgar Cruz
 Edgar Cruz performs Bohemian Rhapsody

Fingerstyle guitarists
Living people
Year of birth missing (living people)